is a professional Japanese baseball player. He is a pitcher for the Chiba Lotte Marines of Nippon Professional Baseball (NPB).

References 

1997 births
Living people
Nippon Professional Baseball pitchers
Baseball people from Okayama Prefecture
Chiba Lotte Marines players